Thumbing one's nose, also known as cocking a snook, is a sign of derision or contempt, made by putting the thumb on the nose, holding the palm open and perpendicular to the face, and wiggling the remaining fingers. It is used mostly by schoolchildren, often combined with sticking out the tongue. It is also known as thumbing the nose, Anne's Fan or Queen Anne's Fan.

The phrase "cocking a snook" can be used figuratively: the Oxford English Dictionary cites a 1938 usage "The Rome–Berlin axis...cocked the biggest snook yet at the League of Nations idea" by Eric Ambler in his Cause for Alarm.

See also
 I've got your nose

References

Hand gestures